In mathematics, Rathjen's  psi function is an ordinal collapsing function developed by Michael Rathjen. It collapses weakly Mahlo cardinals  to generate large countable ordinals. Rathjen uses this to diagonalise over the weakly inaccessible hierarchy.

Definition 
Lastly, an ordinal  is said to be to be strongly critical if .

For  and :

 

For :

Explanation 

 Restrict  to uncountable regular cardinals.
  is a unique increasing function such that the range of  is exactly .
, where  denotes the class of non-zero limit ordinals.
 
 
 
 
 
 
 
 

Rathjen originally defined the  function in more complicated a way in order to create an ordinal notation associated to it. Therefore, it is not certain whether the simplified OCF above yields an ordinal notation or not. The original  functions used in Rathjen's original OCF are also not so easy to understand, and differ from the  functions defined above.

Rathjen's  and the simplification provided above are not the same OCF. This is partially because the former is known to admit an ordinal notation, while the latter isn't known to admit an ordinal notation. Rathjen's  is often confounded with another of his OCFs which also uses the symbol , but they are distinct notions. The former one is a published OCF, while the latter one is just a function symbol in an ordinal notation associated to an unpublished OCF.

References

Mathematical logic
Ordinal numbers
Cardinal numbers